The fourth season of the CBS action-adventure series MacGyver premiered on February 7, 2020 as a mid-season replacement for the 2019–20 television season. CBS renewed the series for a fourth season in May 2019. The season contained thirteen episodes and concluded on May 8, 2020. The series continues to center on the fictional Phoenix Foundation which is a covert organization masquerading as a think tank. It stars Lucas Till, Tristin Mays, Justin Hires, Meredith Eaton, Levy Tran and Henry Ian Cusick.

The season premiere, "Fire + Ashes + Legacy = Phoenix", was watched by 5.94 million viewers, while the season finale, "Save + The + Dam + World", was watched by 5.77 million viewers. The most watched episode of the season was the eighth episode of the season, "Father + Son + Father + Matriarch", with 7.07 million viewers.

Cast and characters

Main
 Lucas Till as Angus "Mac" MacGyver
 Tristin Mays as Riley Davis
 Justin Hires as Wilt Bozer
 Meredith Eaton as Matilda "Matty" Webber
 Levy Tran as Desiree "Desi" Nguyen
 Henry Ian Cusick as Russell "Russ/Rusty" Taylor

Recurring
Leonardo Nam as Aubrey
Tate Donovan as James "Jimmy" MacGyver/Oversight
Jeri Ryan as Gwendolyn "Gwen" Hayes
Amber Skye Noyes as Scarlett

Guest stars
Joshua Leonard as Martin Bishop
Xander Berkeley as General John Acosta
Emmanuelle Vaugier as Major Anne Frost
Amanda Schull as Emilia West
James Murray as Maître d’
Sal Vulcano as Chef Salvatore
Joe Gatto as Larry
Brian Quinn as Dale
Keith David as Burke
John Ales as Nikola Tesla
Scottie Thompson as Ellen MacGyver
Zach McGowan as Roman
Tobin Bell as Leland

Episodes

The number in the "No. overall" column refers to the episode's number within the overall series, whereas the number in the "No. in season" column refers to the episode's number within this particular season. "U.S. viewers (millions)" refers to the number of viewers in the U.S. in millions who watched the episode as it was aired.

Production

Development
On May 9, 2019, CBS renewed MacGyver for a fourth season, with Terry Matalas replacing Craig O'Neill as co-showrunner alongside Peter M. Lenkov. It was later revealed that the season would premiere on February 7, 2020, after being pushed to mid-season to make room for Magnum P.I. on CBS' Friday schedule. On November 6, 2019, it was revealed that CBS had ordered nine additional episodes which would’ve brought the season order to twenty-two episodes. However, on March 14, 2020, it was announced that production on the fourth season had been shut down due to the COVID-19 pandemic. As a result, CBS later decided to save some of the remaining episodes for season 5 and end season 4 after episode thirteen. Following the conclusion of the season, Lenkov was fired from both MacGyver and Magnum P.I. on July 7, 2020, following allegations that he created a toxic work environment. Lenkov had also been the showrunner of Hawaii Five-0, which concluded in April 2020, three months before his firing. He was replaced by Monica Macer for season five. In response the Lenkov's firing, series star Lucas Till said that Lenkov's actions caused him to feel suicidal and that Lenkov bullied, verbally abused, and body-shamed him, which a spokesperson for Lenkov claimed was not true.

Casting
On May 9, 2019, it was announced that Levy Tran, who plays Desi Nguyen, was expected to be promoted to series regular for the season, after recurring during the previous season. On June 7, 2019, it was officially confirmed that Tran would be promoted to series regular. On June 28, 2019, it was announced that Henry Ian Cusick had been cast as a series regular in the role of Russ. On February 18, 2020, it was announced that Jorge Garcia would guest-star in an episode as Jerry Ortega, his character from Hawaii Five-0, however, his appearance was later delayed until season 5. On February 20, 2020, it was revealed that Jeri Ryan has been cast in a recurring role as MacGyver's aunt Gwen. All four members of the comedy troupe The Tenderloins (James Murray, Sal Vulcano, Joe Gatto, and Brian Quinn) guest-starred in episode seven as restaurant employees. Tate Donovan and Peter Weller both reprised their roles from previous seasons as James MacGyver and Elliot Mason, respectively.

Viewing figures

References

MacGyver
2020 American television seasons
Television productions suspended due to the COVID-19 pandemic